Allium brandegeei is a plant species native to the western United States. It has been reported from western Colorado, Utah, Idaho, eastern Oregon, Park County, Montana and Elko County, Nevada.

References

brandegeei
Onions
Flora of Colorado
Flora of Montana
Flora of Idaho
Flora of Nevada
Flora of Oregon
Flora of Utah
Plants described in 1882
Taxa named by Sereno Watson